Sordva is a rural locality (a village) in Yorgvinskoye Rural Settlement, Kudymkarsky District, Perm Krai, Russia. The population was 22 as of 2010.

Geography 
Sordva is located 18 km northeast of Kudymkar (the district's administrative centre) by road. Batina is the nearest rural locality.

References 

Rural localities in Kudymkarsky District